The men's team sprint cross-country skiing competition in the freestyle technique at the 2010 Winter Olympics in Vancouver, Canada was held on 22 February at Whistler Olympic Park in Whistler, British Columbia.

The Swedish team of Björn Lind and Thobias Fredriksson were the defending Olympic champions when the technique was classical. The defending world champions were the Norwegian duo of Ola Vigen Hattestad and Johan Kjølstad when the technique was also classical. Sweden's team of Emil Jönsson and Robin Bryntesson won the test event that took place at the Olympic venue on 18 January 2009. The last World Cup event in this format prior to the 2010 Games took place in Rybinsk, Russia on 24 January 2010 and was won by the Russian duo of Nikolay Morilov and Alexey Petukhov.

Results

Semifinals 
The semifinals took place at 11:35 and 12:00 PST.

Final 
The following are the results of the event.

Neither of the Swedish pair that won at the previous Olympics or at the test event participated and the Swedish team was eliminated in the semifinals. Norway's defending world champions did not participate though the ones who replaced them would win gold. The Russian team that won the last event in this format prior to the Olympics would win bronze.

References

External links
 2010 Winter Olympics results: Men's Team Sprint Free (semifinals), from https://web.archive.org/web/20100222080013/http://www.vancouver2010.com/ retrieved 2010-02-21.
 2010 Winter Olympics results: Men's Team Sprint Free (final), from https://web.archive.org/web/20100222080013/http://www.vancouver2010.com/ retrieved 2010-02-21.

Men's cross-country skiing at the 2010 Winter Olympics
Men's team sprint cross-country skiing at the Winter Olympics